Si Pa Phìn is a commune (xã) and village of the Nậm Pồ District of Điện Biên Province in northwestern Vietnam.

Communes of Điện Biên province
Populated places in Điện Biên province